Woodsia scopulina, common name Rocky Mountain woodsia, is a deciduous perennial fern in the family Woodsiaceae.

This plant is native to the western and northern United States and Canada. W. scopulina is a small to medium sized fern, 10-30 centimeters high, which grows in mesic to dry rock crevices.

Description
Woodsia scopulina has twice pinnate fronds arising from a short scaly rhizome. The mostly upright fronds are 10-30 cm in length and up to 8 cm in width and are medium to pale green in color. The pinnae and rachis are sparsely to moderately covered with long hairs that protrude sharply (not appressed to stem), some with a globular gland at the tip. The rachis is grooved on top (adaxially). Small round sori on the underside of pinnae are initially partly covered with a narrowly lobed indusium. New leaves show circinate vernation (tightly curled).

Range
Woodsia scopulina is widespread in mountains near the west coast of North America from southern Alaska to southern California, and in the Rocky Mountains from British Columbia to Colorado. There are also isolated populations in northeastern North America.

Habitat
Woodsia scopulina is commonly found in sunny rocky habitats including rock crevices, talus slopes, and rock ledges.

Gallery

References

External links

Jepson Manual Treatment
USDA Plants Profile
Flora of North America
Washington Burke Museum
Photo gallery

scopulina
Ferns of the United States
Flora of the Rocky Mountains
Flora of the Western United States
Flora of the Northern United States
Flora of the Northwestern United States
Flora of Western Canada
Flora of Canada